"Tosh" is a single by the English electronic music band Fluke. Eventually released on the album Oto, the track was the second of two singles released by Fluke in 1995. A VHS promotional video release was created for the song.

Versions

References

1995 singles
Fluke (band) songs
1995 songs